OpenAirplane was a private for-profit company founded in 2012 by Rod Rakic. It intended to "make renting a (general aviation) plane as easy as renting a car."

The company ceased operations on 23 December 2019.

History
OpenAirplane was founded in 2012 as a web-based service to make access to rental aircraft easier. Pilots in the United States usually need a flight review (also called a "checkout") with a certified flight instructor at each aircraft rental company or  fixed-base operator (FBO) that they wish to rent from, regardless of recent flight experience. This checkout can take several hours and the pilot must pay for both the rental of the airplane as well as the wage of the flight instructor.

OpenAirplane requires member pilots to complete a standardized checkout procedure called a "Universal Pilot Checkout (UPC)" in a particular make and model of aircraft at an OpenAirplane member FBO.  Once successfully completed, the UPC allows a pilot to fly the same make/model aircraft at any other member FBO without additional checkrides or experience reviews.  The checkout procedure is based on the Civil Air Patrol (CAP) procedure and pilots holding the relevant CAP approval do not need to carry out a further checkout.

The company was endorsed by Starr Aviation, a member of Starr International Company (insurance), and the Cessna Aircraft Company.

OpenAirplane launched on June 17, 2013 with operators in six US locations: Chicago,  Long Island, Kissimmee, Troy, Long Beach, and San Jose.  As of Sep 2014, OpenAirplane had grown to over 71 locations.

At  Sun 'n Fun 2014, OpenAirplane announced the expansion of their program to allow privately owned aircraft to be rented through OpenAirplane.  Insurance carrier Starr Aviation created a new kind of insurance policy that offered coverage for aircraft owners who wanted to make their aircraft available to pilots using OpenAirplane. The new policy is claimed to only be a modest increase in cost compared to group rental coverage that typically costs four- or eight-times as much as a personal aircraft policy.

In Oct 2014, OpenAirplane and Cirrus Aircraft Corporation announced a collaboration where pilots who complete Cirrus factory training are able to rent the same model Cirrus aircraft in the OpenAirplane network without needing an OpenAirplane checkout.  The privilege is valid for six months, after which the pilot will need to complete a normal OpenAirplane UPC.

The company shutdown on 23 December 2019. Founder Rod Rakic blamed the company's failure on lack of market interest. He stated "while the idea of OpenAirplane won us praise, fans, and even super fans, the reality is that too few pilots took to the skies to make the operation sustainable. If there’s one thing that we learned the hard way, it is that it’s tough to get pilots off the couch and into the cockpit."

References

External links 
 
 Official website archives on Archive.org
 AVweb interview with Rod Rakic, the co-founder of OpenAirplane

General aviation
Aviation websites
Internet properties established in 2012
2012 establishments in Illinois
2019 disestablishments in Illinois